is a highway in Japan on the island of Honshū which runs from Nagai City in Yamagata Prefecture to Yamagata City, in the same prefecture.

Route description
 Length: 45.3 km (28 mi)
 Origin: Nagai City
 Terminus: Yamagata City
 Major cities: Yamagata

Municipalities passed through
 Yamagata Prefecture
 Nagai - Shirataka - Nan'yō - Kaminoyama - Yamagata

References

348
Roads in Yamagata Prefecture